Find the Witness is a 1937 American drama film directed by David Selman and starring Charles Quigley, Henry Mollison and Rosalind Keith.

Cast
 Charles Quigley as Larry McGill 
 Henry Mollison as Rudolph Mordini  
 Rosalind Keith as Linda Mason  
 Rita La Roy as Rita Calmette  
 Wade Boteler as Inspector Collins 
 Ernie Alexander as Jerry  
 Stanley Andrews as District Attorney  
 William Arnold as Reporter 
 Hooper Atchley as Carney  
 Sven Hugo Borg as Diver  
 Don Brodie as Reporter  
 Ralph Byrd as Tex  
 Nick Copeland as Manning 
 Frank De Voe as Reporter 
 Gladys Gale as Mrs. Rice  
 Creighton Hale as Bell Captain  
 Eddie Hart as Sailor  
 Harry Harvey as Barker  
 William Humphrey as Minister  
 Charles King as Burton 
 Ralph McCullough as Reporter  
 Ted Oliver as Deagle  
 Lee Shumway as Higgins  
 Reginald Simpson as Clerk  
 Harry Stafford as Judge  
 John Tyrrell as Jackson  
 Blanca Vischer as Spanish Waitress  
 Frederick Vogeding as Larson  
 Alyce Ardell as Louise  
 Jimmy Conlin as Swifty Mullins  
 Harry Depp as Dr. Rice  
 Edward Earle as Mr. Quinn  
 Charles C. Wilson as Charley Blair

References

Bibliography
 Larry Langman & Daniel Finn. A Guide to American Crime Films of the Thirties. Greenwood Press, 1995.

External links
 

1937 films
1937 crime drama films
1930s English-language films
American crime drama films
Films directed by David Selman
Columbia Pictures films
American black-and-white films
1930s American films